Rock Ledge Ranch Historic Site is a living history museum (sometimes called an open-air museum) and farm located in Colorado Springs, Colorado, United States. Restored buildings and period-appropriate attired museum guides depict life in the Pikes Peak region in four time periods and in four different households: American Indian life in 1775; an 1860s cabin (Galloway Homestead); an 1880s farm (Chambers Home and Ranch); and a 1907 Edwardian Country Estate. Each residence (teepee, log cabin, farm house, mansion) reflects the construction and contents of homes of those periods.  It is listed on the National Register of Historic Places.

Museum
Museum guides, each wearing clothing specific to the time period and type of residence, explain and demonstrate activities of daily life of those who lived in the region.  Visitors see and participate to learn how people from different time periods lived during the eras: clothing, meal prep and cooking, cleaning, laundry, mowing, games and entertainment, and how they made their living.

There is a working 19th Century blacksmith shop, barn, horses, and chickens. Sheep and a cow graze around the farm. At one time, peacocks were resident. The historical interpreters demonstrate daily living skills, and encourage visitors to participate. The museum hosts over 100,000 people on an annual basis.

Because of the City of Colorado Spring's economic difficulties in 2009, its funding and continued existence was threatened  however an aggressive fundraising campaign has generated huge public support as well as additional opportunities to experience this setting due to themed special events such as Fiddles, Vittles, and Vino and a Shakespeare festival.

References

External links

Mission Revival architecture in Colorado
Museums in Colorado Springs, Colorado
Open-air museums in Colorado
Ranches on the National Register of Historic Places in Colorado
Living museums in Colorado
National Register of Historic Places in Colorado Springs, Colorado
1875 establishments in Colorado Territory
Blacksmith shops